In many denominations of Christianity the ordination of women is a relatively recent phenomenon within the life of the Church. As opportunities for women have expanded in the last 50 years, those ordained women who broke new ground or took on roles not traditionally held by women in the Church have been and continue to be considered notable. This list includes ordained ministers, bishops and other church leaders who have made an impact on their Christian denomination, or have been recognized as pathbreakers. Due to historical differences deaconesses will not be included. In Presbyterianism, Methodism and a few other denominations the ordination of women predates 1900 and is now common enough to be unremarkable. Therefore, most ordained women clergy in these denominations are not included. Where women are making ground-breaking strides in those denominations, some individuals are included.

African Methodist Episcopal Church
Carrie T. Hooper - first woman to run for election as bishop in AME Church
Vashti Murphy McKenzie - first woman elected bishop in the African Methodist Episcopal Church

Anglicanism
Nerva Cot Aguilera -  first woman bishop in the Episcopal Church of Cuba, and within the Anglican communion in all of Latin America, and first woman bishop in the Caribbean
Joyce M. Bennett - first English woman to be ordained a priest in the Anglican Communion
Miriam Byrne - provost in the Scottish Episcopal Church
Eleanor Clitheroe-Bell - priest and former businesswoman
Barbara Clementine Harris - first woman consecrated as bishop in the Episcopal Church USA, and in the Anglican communion
Griselda Delgado Del Carpio - first woman to become a diocesan bishop in the  Episcopal Church of Cuba
Kay Goldsworthy - installed as Archbishop of Perth in 2018, first woman Archbishop in the Anglican Church of Australia
Jane Hwang - along with Joyce M. Bennett, first regularly ordained Anglican priests in Hong Kong
Penny Jamieson - first woman to become a bishop in the Anglican Church in Aotearoa, New Zealand and Polynesia; first woman to become a diocesan bishop in the Anglican Communion.
Florence Li Tim-Oi - first woman ordained as an Anglican priest
Molly McGreevy - former soap opera actress, ordained priest in the Episcopal Church
Katharine Jefferts Schori - first woman to become primate of an Anglican church
Libby Lane - first woman to become a bishop in the Church of England
Rachel Treweek - first woman to become a diocesan bishop in the Church of England
Dame Sarah Mullally - suffragan bishop in the Church of England
Victoria Matthews - first woman to become a bishop in the Anglican Church of Canada; first woman to become a diocesan bishop; first woman to be translated from one diocese (Toronto) to another (Christchurch, New Zealand)
Pat Storey - first woman to become a diocesan bishop in the Church of Ireland
Ellinah Wamukoya - first woman to become a diocesan bishop in the Anglican Church of Southern Africa
Sarah Macneil - first woman to become a diocesan bishop in the Anglican Church of Australia
Pushpa Lalitha - first woman to become a diocesan bishop in the  Church of South India
June Osborne - first woman to become bishop in the Church in Wales
Joanna Penberthy - second woman to become bishop in the Church in Wales
Anne Dyer - first woman to become bishop in the Scottish Episcopal Church

Baptist
 Regina Claas in Germany :de:Bund Evangelisch-Freikirchlicher Gemeinden

Catholic

Ludmila Javorová - made public in 1995 her claim to have been ordained in 1970 during Communist rule in Czechoslovakia. The ordination of Javorová, although officiated by a bishop in communion with the Pope, was declared to be invalid.

Several Catholic groups not in communion with the Pope allow women to be ordained.

Christine Mayr-Lumetzberger - excommunicated for unlawful ordination
Sinéad O'Connor - excommunicated for ordination by Independent Catholic Michael Cox
Mary Ramerman - one of the founders of Spiritus Christi

Lutheranism
 Elizabeth Platz - first woman ordained in Lutheran Church in America, American Lutheranism
 Margot Käßmann - bishop in Evangelical-Lutheran Church of Hanover, German Lutheranism (1999-2010)
 Maria Jepsen - bishop in North Elbian Evangelical Lutheran Church - first woman to become a Lutheran bishop worldwide Germany (1991-2010) 
 Bärbel Wartenberg-Potter - bishop in North Elbian Evangelical Lutheran Church, Germany (2001-2008)
 Susanne Breit-Keßler - bishop in Germany
 Rosemarie Köhn - bishop in Church of Norway (1993–2006)
 Lise-Lotte Rebel - bishop in Church of Denmark (since 1995)
 Christina Odenberg - bishop in Church of Sweden — (1996-2007)
 Irja Askola  - bishop in Evangelical Lutheran Church of Finland (since 2010)
 Marianne Christiansen - bishop in Church of Denmark (since 2013)
 Antje Jackelén - bishop in Church of Sweden (since 2007)
 Eva Brunne - bishop in Church of Sweden (since 2009)
 Sofie Petersen - bishop in Greenland of Church of Denmark (since 1995)
 Ingeborg Midttømme - bishop in Church of Norway (since 2008)
 Elizabeth Eaton - bishop in Evangelical Lutheran Church in America (since 2013)
 Solveig Fiske - bishop in Church of Norway (since 2006)
 Marie C. Jerge - bishop in Evangelical Lutheran Church in America (since 2002)
 Helga Haugland Byfuglien - bishop in Church of Norway (since 2005)
 Susan Johnson - bishop in Evangelical Lutheran Church in Canada (since 2007)
 Tuulikki Koivunen Bylund - bishop in Church of Sweden (since 2009)
 Wilma Kucharek - bishop in Slovak Zion Synod (since 2002)
 Caroline Krook - bishop in Church of Sweden (since 1998)
 Laila Riksaasen Dahl - bishop in Church of Norway (since 2002)
 Agnes M. Sigurðardóttir - bishop in Church of Iceland (since 2012)
 Kirsten Fehrs - bishop in Evangelical Lutheran Church in Northern Germany (since 2011)
 Tine Lindhardt - bishop in Church of Denmark (since 2012)
 Kristina Kühnbaum-Schmidt - bishop in Evangelical Lutheran Church in Northern Germany (since 2019)

Methodist
 Rosemarie Wenner - bishop in Germany
 Minerva G. Carcaño - bishop in the United States
 Judith Craig - bishop in the United States
 Violet L. Fisher - bishop in the United States
 Carolyn Tyler Guidry - bishop in the United States
 Janice Riggle Huie - bishop in the United States
 Leontine T. Kelly - bishop in the United States
 Marjorie Matthews - bishop in the United States
 Mary Ann Swenson - bishop in the United States
 Mary Virginia Taylor - bishop in the United States
 Karen Oliveto - bishop in the United States

Pentecostal
Aimee Semple McPherson - Founder of Foursquare International Church
Maria Woodworth-Etter - Ordained Assemblies of God Holiness and Pentecostal Pastor and Evangelist
Ida Robinson - Founder of Mt Sinai Holy Church of America  
Mary Magdalena Lewis Tate - Founder of  Church of the Living God 
Florence L. Crawford - Founder of Apostolic Faith Mission 
Rosa Horn - Founder of Mt Calvary Pentecostal Church of All Nations
Michel Girtman-White (1949-2020) - Founder of The Cathedral at Greater Faith and Former Assistant Presiding Bishop of the Churches of the Living

Presbyterian
Mary Levison - first woman to become a minister in the Church of Scotland
Sheilagh Kesting - minister in the Church of Scotland
Lorna Hood - minister in the Church of Scotland
Margaret Towner - first woman to be ordained a minister of the United Presbyterian Church in the United States of America (UPCUSA) (1956)
Rachel Henderlite - first woman to be ordained a pastor of the Presbyterian Church in the United States (PCUS) (1965)
Katie Geneva Cannon - first African American woman ordained a minister in United Presbyterian Church in the United States of America (UPCUSA) (1974)
Rebecca Reyes) - first Hispanic/Latina woman ordained a minister in the Presbyterian Church in the United States (PCUS) (1979)
Elizabeth Kwon - transferred her ordination from Japan in 1979 and became the first female Korean-American ministern in the United Presbyterian Church in the United States of America (UPCUSA) (1979)
Holly Haile Smith Davis - first Native American woman ordained as a teaching elder in the Presbyterian Church, ordained in the Presbyterian Church (U.S.A.) (PCUSA) (1987)

United and Uniting churches
 Brigitte Boehme - Evangelical Church of Bremen (2001-2013)
 Edda Bosse - Evangelical Church of Bremen (since 2013)
Yvonne V. Delk- first African-American woman ordained in the United Church of Christ
 Yvette Flunder - minister in United Church of Christ
 Beate Hofmann - Evangelical Church of Hesse Electorate-Waldeck (since 2019)
 Ilse Junkermann - bishop in Evangelical Church in Central Germany (2009-2019)
 Annette Kurschus - bishop (präses) in Evangelical Church of Westphalia (since 2012)
 Madge Saunders - first woman in the United Church in Jamaica and the Cayman Islands to serve as a parish priest (1975)
 Adlyn White - first woman ordained by the United Church in Jamaica and the Cayman Islands (1973); first woman to head the church (1991)
Lois Miriam Wilson - first woman moderator of the United Church of Canada

References

Women bishops
Lists of women